Halas may refer to:

 Halas (surname)
 Halas (food)
Halas lace
 Halas and Batchelor, an animation company
 Kiskunhalas, a town in Hungary, colloquially known as "Halas"

See also
 
 Hala (disambiguation)